The 2016–17 season was Delfino Pescara 1936's first season in the top-flight of Italian football after the club's relegation to Serie B at the end of the 2012–13 season. Pescara suffered a miserable campaign, languishing in the relegation places for the entire season and finishing 20th with only 18 points, 3 wins (one of those awarded), and 81 goals conceded. The club were eliminated in the Coppa Italia fourth round by Atalanta.

Players

Squad information
Players and squad numbers last updated on 22 August 2016.Note: Flags indicate national team as has been defined under FIFA eligibility rules. Players may hold more than one non-FIFA nationality.

Transfers

In

Loans in

Out

Loans out

Pre-season and friendlies

Competitions

Overall

Last updated: 28 May 2017

Serie A

League table

Results summary

Results by round

Matches

Note

Coppa Italia

Statistics

Appearances and goals

|-
! colspan=14 style=background:#dcdcdc; text-align:center| Goalkeepers

|-
! colspan=14 style=background:#dcdcdc; text-align:center| Defenders

|-
! colspan=14 style=background:#dcdcdc; text-align:center| Midfielders

|-
! colspan=14 style=background:#dcdcdc; text-align:center| Forwards

|-
! colspan=14 style=background:#dcdcdc; text-align:center| Players transferred out during the season

Goalscorers

Last updated: 28 May 2017

Clean sheets

Last updated: 28 May 2017

Disciplinary record

Last updated: 28 May 2017

References

Delfino Pescara 1936 seasons
Pescara